Borgen is a station shared by the Røa Line and the Kolsås Line on the Oslo T-bane system.

The station is located on a stretch where the line runs alongside Sørkedalsveien. The large Vestre gravlund cemetery is situated to the south of the station.

The station was opened on 17 November 1912 as part of a branch line to Holmenkollbanen that went to Smestad and was later extended. There were originally four stations on this line; only Borgen and Smestad remain. The two stations that originally neighbored Borgen, Volvat in the east and Heggeli in the west, are both closed.

References

External links

Oslo Metro stations in Oslo
Railway stations opened in 1912
1912 establishments in Norway